Nitrosococcus is a genus of Gram-negative bacteria.

References

Chromatiales
Bacteria genera